Ibrahim Jamil "Ebro" Darden (born March 17, 1975) is an American radio personality, broadcaster, and DJ. Until 2014, he was Vice President of Programming for Emmis Communications' New York contemporary urban station WQHT (Hot 97). He is currently a co-host of the Hot 97 morning show Ebro in the Morning, alongside Peter Rosenberg and Laura Stylez. As of 2015, Darden also hosts a hip hop music-based radio show on Apple Music 1

Early life 
Dardens was born to a Black father and a Jewish mother. He attended a Pentecostal church and Hebrew school while growing up in Oakland and Sacramento.

Career

Start in radio 
Darden began his career in radio in 1990 at KSFM in Sacramento, California, while he was still a teenager. At KSFM he worked in research and as a sales runner until moving into programming as an intern, and later co-hosting for KSFM's night and morning shows. In 1997, he worked at KBMB in Sacramento as programming and music director, as well as an afternoon host. Eventually, Darden became operations manager at KBMB, while also co-hosting mornings at KXJM in Portland, Oregon, in 1999.

Hot 97 
In 2003, Darden became music director for WQHT, ultimately becoming the program director for the station in 2007.

Darden worked alongside several past WQHT Hot 97 morning show co-hosts including Star and Buckwild, Miss Jones, DJ Envy, Sway, and Joe Budden from 2004 to 2007, and introduced Cipha Sounds and Peter Rosenberg to the AM drive in 2009. He rejoined the Hot 97 Morning Show in 2012, alongside Cipha Sounds, Peter Rosenberg, and Laura Stylez.

As programming director and on-air host, Darden was the main voice of several events at Hot 97 including Nicki Minaj's relationship with the station, and her alleged sexual relationship with the host; Hurricane Sandy; and Mister Cee's personal life.

In 2014, VH1 announced a new unscripted comedy series, This Is Hot 97, which featured Darden and fellow hosts including Angie Martinez, Funkmaster Flex, Peter Rosenberg, Cipha Sounds, Miss Info, and Laura Stylez.

Apple Music 1 
In addition to his current on-air role at Hot 97, Darden is now one of three anchor DJs on Apple Music 1 an internet radio service from Apple Music. He is also the Global Editorial Head of Hip-Hop and R&B for Apple Music.

Feuds and controversy 
A comedic rivalry between Darden and fellow accomplished radio personality Charlamagne tha God of Power 105.1 has been ongoing for years. In May 2017, Darden clarified their relationship, stating, "The stuff we do on the radio is stupid. It's for fun. I make fun of you for fun. That's it. It's not that deep... me and that dude don't have a personal problem... a personal relationship".

Darden was mentioned in Remy Ma's "shETHER" diss track, on which Ma insinuated that he slept with Nicki Minaj by stating "Coke head, you cheated on your man with Ebro". After jokingly going back and forth with both Ma and her husband Papoose on social media, Darden denied the rumors, stating that he and Minaj had only a professional relationship.

Ebro has been in an ongoing feud with Brooklyn artist 6ix9ine. Ebro made fun of 6ix9ine as looking like a clown and criticized him for bragging about streaming numbers.

Personal life 
Darden has a daughter, Isa, who was born in 2014.

Recognition 
In 2013, Darden was recognized by Radio Ink as a future African American leader.

Filmography

References 

1975 births
Living people
African-American radio personalities
African-American Jews
American music people
20th-century American Jews
American reality television producers
Participants in American reality television series
People from Sacramento, California
American radio executives
Television producers from California
21st-century African-American people
21st-century American Jews
20th-century African-American people
Tikar people
American people of Tikar descent